The John Frank House was built in 1955 in Sapulpa, Oklahoma, United States. It was designed by architect Bruce Goff. It was designed for John Frank, founder of Frankoma Pottery. It was specifically designed to showcase the Franks' love for pottery. John and Grace Lee Frank glazed and fired the ceramic tiles located throughout the house.

The home is listed on the National Register of Historic Places.  It is available for the public to visit upon request. Tour times are available Thursday though Sunday in the afternoons, although alternative times may be requested.

References

External links
Official site
Oklahoma Modern: House of Clay
Photos

Bruce Goff buildings
Houses in Creek County, Oklahoma
Historic house museums in Oklahoma
Museums in Creek County, Oklahoma
Houses completed in 1955
Houses on the National Register of Historic Places in Oklahoma
Expressionist architecture
Organic architecture
American pottery
National Register of Historic Places in Creek County, Oklahoma
1955 establishments in Oklahoma